Phillip Bawden (born 2 September 1953) is an Australian cricketer who was a fast bowler. He played in one List A match for Queensland in 1973/74.

Bawden debuted in Brisbane Grade Cricket for Sandgate-Redcliffe in the 1972/73 season and he later also played for Toombul. His nickname became Sir and he was reported by his peers as having notable pace as a fast bowler but with little control.

See also
 List of Queensland first-class cricketers

References

External links
 

1953 births
Living people
Australian cricketers
Queensland cricketers
People from Lismore, New South Wales
Cricketers from New South Wales